The Ordnance Quick-Firing 17-pounder (or just 17-pdr) was a 76.2 mm (3 inch) gun developed by the United Kingdom during World War II. It was used as an anti-tank gun on its own carriage, as well as equipping a number of British tanks. Used with the APDS shot, it was capable of defeating all but the thickest armour on German tanks. It was used to 'up-gun' some foreign-built vehicles in British service, notably to produce the Sherman Firefly variant of the US M4 Sherman tank, giving British tank units the ability to hold their own against their German counterparts. In the anti-tank role, it was replaced after the war by the 120 mm BAT recoilless rifle. As a tank gun, it was succeeded by the 84 mm 20 pounder.

Development history

Gun development

Before the QF 6-pounder had entered service, the British predicted that it would soon be inadequate given the increasing armour of German tanks. In late 1940, the design of a replacement began, and was largely completed by the end of 1941. A prototype production line was set up in spring 1942, and with the appearance of Tiger I tanks in early 1943 in the North African Campaign, the first 100 prototype 17-pounder anti-tank guns were quickly sent to help counter this new threat. So great was the rush that they were sent before proper carriages had been developed, and the guns had to be mounted in the carriages of 25-pounder gun-howitzers. These early weapons were known as 17/25-pounders and given the codename Pheasant. They first saw action in February 1943.

Fully developed 17-pounders started production in 1943 and were first used during the Italian Campaign. They became one of the most effective weapons on the battlefield, on both carriages and tanks.

The 17-pounder anti-tank guns also saw action in Korea against tanks and in general support use against bunker positions. After Korea, the gun was largely replaced in the tank role by the 84mm calibre,  Ordnance QF 20 pounder, and in the anti-tank role by the BAT, MOBAT and 120 mm L6 WOMBAT series of recoilless rifles.

Adaptation into tanks and AFVs

The 17-pounder outperformed all other Allied armour-piercing guns, and was quickly adapted for use on various tank chassis. However, few tanks were capable of carrying such a large gun due to the size limitations of their turret rings. A new British tank specification, A29, was produced to meet the need for a 17-pounder armed cruiser tank. While the A29 was eventually cancelled without a successful design being produced, an amended specification, A30, reached production in 1943. The A30 specification reduced weight and enabled the use of Cromwell tank components as a design expedient. The resulting Cruiser Mark VIII Challenger had a longer hull and provided a larger turret, allowing the 17-pounder to be mounted along with space for a second loader, thought to be required for the gun's larger ammunition. However, production of the tank took time and few could be completed before the allied invasion of Normandy.

While developing the Challenger tank, the British devised a conversion for their US-supplied M4 Sherman tanks to mount the 17-pounder. This was applied in sufficient numbers to put them into service in time for D-Day as the Sherman Firefly. The gun was a modified design that was produced specifically for the Firefly, the MkIV. A new horizontal-sliding breech was designed as the usual vertical-sliding breech of the Mks I and II made loading very difficult. An additional box was welded to the back of the turret to take the radio, which was moved to allow for the breech and its recoil. A new recoil mechanism, based on the 6-pounder design, was developed and the thicker section of the gun barrel in contact with the cradle was lengthened to match the new recoil system.  The original experimental Sherman mounting at Lulworth was actually rigid with no recoil system. Production of the Challenger was cancelled with only about 200 built, and 2,200 - 2,400 Sherman Is and Vs were converted as Fireflies (sources vary) and deployed in Sherman regiments Italy and NW Europe.  The Challengers were deployed with Cromwell regiments.

The British also converted some of their US-produced M10 tank destroyers, replacing the 3-inch (76 mm) M7 gun with the 17-pounder; the resulting vehicles were called 17pdr SP Achilles or just 17-pdr M10C. These served with Royal Artillery as self-propelled guns.

The 17-pounder was also successfully trialled on the Australian-designed Sentinel tank, though no Sentinels equipped with this gun entered service with the Australian Army.

Efforts to fit the 17pdr on a Cromwell chassis in a better manner than the ungainly Challenger resulted in the Comet tank.  However the Comet could still not take the 17pdr.  The 75mm High Velocity Gun project was resurrected and redesigned to use a shortened version of the 17pdr barrel and the 17pdr projectiles mated to the cartridge of the 3 inch 30cwt anti-aircraft gun.  While often confused with the 17pdr, the 77mm HV, was an entirely separate weapon and was only used on the Comet.

As the war came to a close, the 17-pdr was fitted to the new Centurion tank, then designated as a "heavy cruiser" tank until ultimately being replaced by the 20-pounder in 1949.  The Centurion was the first tank designed around the 17pdr gun.

The United States Army did not use the 17-pdr.  Although the gun was offered to them and tested, they chose to stick with their 76 mm gun M1.  US forces did however request some Firefly conversions in March 1945 and as many as 18 were converted but the war ended before they were shipped from the UK.

Variants

Mark I
 first production versions.
Mark II
 intended for tank use. Removed the carrier mountings and replaced the muzzle brake with a counterweight. The brake was added back on in March 1944 with the introduction of the APDS shot. The Mk. II was used on the Archer self-propelled anti-tank gun and Cruiser Mark VIII Challenger tank.
Mark III
 Royal Navy adaptation for use on landing craft, generally similar to the Mk. I, but included an automatic loading system. Unused.
Mark IV
 Another tank adaptation, this time with a different breech where the block slid to the side instead of down to take up less room. Used on Sherman Firefly.
Mark V
 A version of the Mk IV with different mounts to allow it to replace the US 3 in (76.2 mm) Gun M7 on the 3 in SP, Wolverines, creating the 17pdr SP Achilles.
Mark VI
 Another Mk. IV adaptation with a shortened breech.
Mark VII
 Similar to the Mk. VI, yet another change to the breech.
Straussler Conversion
 This was an experimental gun, designed by Nicholas Straussler that was fitted with a motorized gun-carriage. A modified ammunition limber would be attached to the gun's trails, making a four-wheeled, self-propelled vehicle and removing the need for a truck to tow the gun.

77 mm HV

The British started work on developing a gun that was small enough to fit on their tank designs—particularly the Cromwell cruiser tank then at the design stage. It was intended to fire the US 75 mm projectiles (AP shot and HE) at a higher velocity, avoiding a downgrade in armour penetration versus the 6-pounder, which the dual purpose 75 mm was replacing. The new 50-calibre long gun, known as the Vickers HV 75 mm, fired a 75 mm projectile attached to a necked down 3-inch (76.2 mm) 20 cwt AA gun cartridge through a modified breech. The larger 3" cartridge provided a greater propellant charge compared with normal 75 mm shells. Although the 75 mm HV was a promising weapon, it proved to be too big for the Cromwell tank, which was ultimately fitted with the normal QF 75 mm gun in use on other British tanks. To account for this difference, tank squadrons were teamed with Challenger and Sherman Firefly tanks armed with the 17-pounder.

When the Cromwell's replacement, the Comet, was at the design stage, the 75 mm HV concept was reworked to fire the same projectiles as the 17-pounder through a shortened 17-pounder barrel but retaining the 3-inch cartridge case firing from a standard 3-inch breech. This has the benefit of greater ease of use on tanks, many of which would not have sufficient turret space to accommodate the breech length and recoil distance of the 17-pounder. Similarly, the smaller 3"-based ammunition was easier to store and handle in the tank's cramped interior. This new gun's ammunition was not interchangeable with the 17-pounder and to prevent confusion over ammunition supplies, it was renamed the 77 mm HV—the 'HV' standing for High Velocity—although it was the same 76.2 mm calibre as the 17-pounder.

Ammunition

The 17-pounder used the following ammunition types:
Armour Piercing Capped (APC)
Armour Piercing Capped was a basic AP shell used with field guns, but was not used when the 17pdr was mounted in the Sherman Firefly tank.
Armour Piercing, Capped, Ballistic Capped (APCBC)
Armour Piercing, Capped, Ballistic Capped ammunition could penetrate 163 mm of armour at 500 metres and 150 mm at 1000 m.
Armour-piercing discarding sabot (APDS)
Armour-piercing discarding sabot could penetrate 256 mm of armour at 500 m and 233 mm at 1000 m, and allowing it in theory to penetrate the armour of even the German Tiger II heavy tank. Most sources are in agreement that APDS was not available on D-Day itself, but reached Normandy in increasing amounts by the end of June or early July 1944. It was available for the breakout battle from Normandy and the advance to the Netherlands and Germany.
High Explosive (HE)
The HE shells for the 17-pounder had smaller bursting charges (Mk 1: 1.28 lbs, Mk 2: 1.06 lbs) than those for the 75mm gun used by the Sherman (M48: 1.47 lbs, Mk 1: 1.64 lbs).
Practice, Shot Mk 10
"The components of this practice round are similar to those of Shot APCBC, except for the projectile.  The projectile is made of cast iron and is uncapped.  It is fitted with tracer."

APCBC ammunition was the standard ammunition for the gun, while APDS shot was used for about 6% of the average load of a 17-pounder-equipped British tank.

While offering greater penetration, the smaller (sub-calibre) tungsten core of APDS was considered to provide less accurate fire than APCBC ammunition at ranges beyond 500 yards. This was due to the much lesser visible impact of rounds that fell short, making it hard to spot the fall of shot and correct aim. The APDS was also considered to cause less damage to an enemy tank if it did penetrate the armour. After penetration the core usually disintegrated.

The 17-pounder produced a very large muzzle flash due to the large amount of propellant in its cartridges. Muzzle blast was also significant, described by crews of the anti-tank gun variant as resembling a hard slap on the chest.

NH = non-hygroscopic; i.e. does not absorb moisture.

HC = High capacity.

EFC = Equivalent full charge.  EFC was the basis of calculating the wear effect of propellent charges.  Instructions were to examine the barrel for wear after every 40 EFC.

Performance

 FH marks the performance against face hardened armour (FHA), as opposed to rolled homogeneous armour (RHA).

Use

Anti-tank gun
The 17-pounder was a much bulkier and heavier weapon than its predecessor. As a result, it had to be towed by a gun tractor, such as the Morris Quad, M3 Half-track or the Crusader, as it could not effectively be moved by its gun crew alone, especially on poor ground. After firing on soft ground, the 17-pounder frequently had to be pulled out of the ground due to the gun recoil burying the trail spades. After the Second World War, it was issued to anti-tank units of the Royal Artillery in the British Army of the Rhine (BAOR) towed by the M3 Half Track. When the Royal Artillery anti-tank units were disbanded in 1951, it was transferred to Infantry battalions in the BAOR (six per battalion), towed by the Oxford Tracked Carrier. It was later replaced by the 120 mm BAT recoilless rifle anti-tank weapon.

Pheasant carriage
Also known by the 17/25 pounder designation, a stop-gap measure named Pheasant mated the 17 pounder gun with a modified 25 pounder carriage. This enabled the gun to be pressed into service before its own carriage design was ready.

Split trail carriage
A custom designed carriage for the 17 pounder comprising:
 Split trail carriage, with gunshield.
 Weight: 3 t.
 Elevation: −6° to +16.5°
 Traverse: 60°

Middle East
In the immediate post-war era in the Middle East, Arab national armies - Transjordan, Egypt, Syria and Iraq - mainly used British manufactured artillery, including the towed 17-pounder. The Israelis used a number of 17 pounders that they captured from the Arabs in the war of independence

Vehicle mount

World War II
 Tank, Cruiser, Challenger (A30) - 200 built
 Tank, Cruiser, Comet I (A34) (77 mm OQF HV) - 1,200 by end of war.
 SP 17-pounder, Valentine, Mk I, Archer self-propelled anti-tank gun built on Valentine tank hull, 655 built
 Sherman Firefly - Modified Sherman tank (Medium Tank M4), about 2,000
 17pdr SP Achilles - Modified 3-inch Gun Motor Carriage M10, about 1,100 by end of war
 Tank, Infantry, Black Prince (A43) (experimental development of Churchill tank, never fielded)
 TOG2 (prototype tank, never fielded)
 Australian Cruiser tank Mk IV (prototype turret only, never fielded)

Post-war
 Ratel IFV Concept 1 - a heavily modified South African test-bed chassis.
 Eland Mk7 Concept 2 - a heavily modified South African test-bed chassis.
 Alvis Saracen Concept 3 - a heavily modified South African test-bed chassis.
 Centurion - on A41 prototype and on production Centurion Mk 1 and Mk 2.
 SP 17-pounder, A30 (Avenger) - variant of Challenger, not available in time for war, 250 built

See also

Weapons of comparable role, performance and era
 7.5 cm Pak 40 German anti-tank gun (similar form factor as Anti-Tank gun)
 7.5 cm KwK 42 German tank gun (similar ballistic performance)
76 mm gun M1 US tank gun
 85 mm D-5T Soviet tank gun
75 mm Reșița Model 1943 Romanian anti-tank gun

 Ordnance QF 20-pounder

Notes

References

Further reading

External links

 Great Britain's Gun Penetration Tables
 Imperial War Museum Film "A Date with a Tank"

Tank guns of the United Kingdom
World War II anti-tank guns
World War II tank guns
76 mm artillery
World War II artillery of the United Kingdom
Weapons and ammunition introduced in 1942